The C&C Custom 67 is a Canadian sailboat, that was designed by Robert W. Ball of C&C Yachts and was launched and named Archangel in September 1980. She remains the largest pleasureboat commission ever received by C&C, and epitomized a trend within C&C during the later 1970s and early 1980s toward more cruising-oriented designs under George Cuthbertson's direction, a trend best illustrated by the development of the Landfall series.

Design
The C&C Custom 67 Archangel is a recreational keelboat, intended primarily for world cruising. She was commissioned by Michael Davies, publisher of the Kingston Whig-Standard newspaper, who Cuthbertson knew quite well. Davies participated extensively in the design and build process. He wanted a cruising yacht large enough to voyage anywhere in the world in comfort, but requiring only a small crew.

Davies had very clear ideas what he wanted in Archangel. He wanted a boat with uncompromising windward ability; a boat that he would not have to motorsail, or worse yet, power, whenever the wind came ahead. This resulted in the schooner rig being chosen for Archangel, resulting in a boat that goes to wind as well as a sloop rig, but also allows Archangel's vast sail area to be distributed about the boat in manageable proportions.

Davies wanted a dry boat, which required an aft-cockpit layout. He also decided that watchkeepers should have access to the radar, navigation instruments, and the plot, without having to go below where they are cut off from all else that may be going on in the world. Such a requirement evolved into a pilothouse, which allowed the option of inside steering and gave the aft open cockpit considerable shelter from spray.

As a final requirement, Davies wanted a boat that would be as independent of shore and shore facilities as possible. That was met with a rig strong enough (in theory) to allow Archangel to carry on, in 50 knots of wind, massive tankage, two sources of AC power, desalinators, a huge freezer and two dinghies.

Production
The boat was built by Erich Bruckmann and his crew at C&C Yachts Custom Division in Oakville, Ontario, Canada. Archangel was an enormous project—six months in design and 14 months in construction. Only one example was completed.

Construction
Archangel is built predominantly of fiberglass with a balsa core, and finished with wood trim. She is flush decked with an aft cockpit and helm, as well as a substantial pilothouse with internal helm, navigation area and pilot berth. The fin keel is externally bolted with lead ballast encapsulated in GRP. The spade rudder is fitted with a partial skeg.  She has teak decks and bulwarks.  The deckbox (a covered well between the masts) accommodates a  RIB dinghy with a  outboard motor. She is also equipped with two eight-man liferafts.

Masts and rigging
Archangel is configured as a Bermudian schooner. The rig is powerful and flexible and is equipped with furling systems and powered self-tailing winches designed to facilitate sailing with a smaller crew. Both spars, the mainmast and foremast (each weighing ), have electric roller furling with manual back up. All standing rigging is Navtec discontinuous stainless steel rod. There is a Navtec control console for vangs and mainmast backstay control. There are two carbon Spinnaker poles on deck.

Sails and sail handling
When first launched her sails were Hood Eclipse ultraviolet-resistant cloth. The main and foresail are an identical  (She only qualifies as a schooner because the after mast is stepped on foot higher than the fore.) These two sails reef and furl into Hood Stoway spars equipped with electric roller furling with manual back up. The  foresail has Hood Sea Furl manual roller furling assisted by the powered Barient winches (also with manual back up). The four self-tailing Barinet primary and secondary winches surrounding the cockpit are also electrically driven, again with manual back up just in case.

Thanks to the adjustments possible with the roller rig, Archangel can be balanced under any conditions. In heavy weather, her 9.8-oz man would be completely furled, leaving as much of the 17-oz. foresail as required to balance the 10.5-oz. jib rolled down to storm size.

For light airs, Archangel carries a 7-oz. genoa, an  main staysail, and a spinnaker, allowing her to set  of sail for downwind sailing.

Accommodations
Archangel has extensive interior joinery of teak with white painted bulkheads, cabin soles of teak and holly, and deckheads strip planked in cedar. She has a master stateroom which includes a large double aft cabin with en-suite heads equipped with a shower-bathsauna.

There is a comprehensive galley equipped with a dual fridge/freezer system, stainless steel gimballed 4-burner cooker with oven, microwave, and two stainless steel sinks.

The large saloon has a fireplace, two sitting areas (one with a gimballed table for dining at sea), and a navigation station.

Forward of the saloon are two twin guest cabins plus an additional guest or crew cabin in the forepeak with an access hatch to the foredeck.

Systems
Main engine: Originally launched with a  turbo-charged Volvo TAMD 70C inboard diesel engine (replaced in 1992 with a Caterpillar Inc. 3208  diesel engine) fitted with a Hundested hydraulic gear box which drives a 3 blade variable pitch propeller, controlled from both the pilot house and cockpit. Cruising speed: , Maximum speed: . Also installed is an American Marine dual station proportional control bow thruster  fitted in 1992.

Electrics: Westerbeke 15 kW 120 / 240 V generator, a 150 A engine alternator, a 60 A engine alternator.

Navigation equipment:

In pilot house:
 Furuno FR8100D 72 mile daylight radar
 Robertson 8P45HD autopilot
 Gyro compass
 Trimble Navgraphic XL GPS chartplotter, interfaced with radar and autopilot
 Radar angle indicator
 Brooks & Gatehouse (B&G) wind indicator
 Two B&G Hydra 2 Multi Function Displays (MFD)
 B&G electronic compass
 Stephens Sea 156 VHF radio
 Numerous displays for hydraulics and mechanical systems

In cockpit:
 Two B&G 20/20 displays
 B&G wind direction
 Radar angle indicator
 Ritchie steering compass in stainless binnacle
 Horn

Navigation station in saloon:
 Stephens Sea 156 VHF
 Stephens Sea 225 SSB
 ICOM IC 735 SSB
 Trimble Transpak II GPS
 B&G Hydra 2 MFD

HVAC: Two chilled water Lumaire reverse cycle air conditioning units of 3 ton and 2 ton capacity, and two Espar 7.5 kW diesel heaters.

Water supply: Three fresh water tanks total capacity , Sea Fresh watermaker, output /hour and a stainless steel  hot water heater.

Ground tackle:
 Maxwell 4000 electric anchor windlass with foot control switch
 Bruce  anchor
 CQR  anchor

Operational history
After her launch, Archangel spent the best part of a month in Oakville harbor, working through her sailing and powering trials and being labored over by most of the C&C Custom Division staff. The work crew often included
Davies, who enjoyed being crossexamined about himself and his boat by onlookers who assumed he was a workman. By September 1981 Davies and his family had already voyaged from Canada to Bermuda and on to the Virgin Islands.

Archangel later became Sir Peter Blake and Lady Blake's family yacht. During this period Sir Peter used her as his command boat for Team New Zealand through their successful defence of the America's Cup in 2000.

Michael Bundock purchased Archangel from Lady Blake in Barcelona in 2004. Bundock then spent about two years sailing her halfway around the world, eventually taking her back to his home in New Zealand. Archangel is currently based in Auckland and is sailed regularly on the Hauraki Gulf. Her sail number is now NZL1040.

See also
 List of sailing boat types

References

Keelboats
1980s sailboat type designs
Sailing yachts
Sailboat type designs by Robert W. Ball
Sailboat types built by C&C Yachts